Musabeyli District is a district of Kilis Province of Turkey. Its seat is the town Musabeyli. The district is mostly populated by Turks but also Kurds, Romani people and Arabs. It had a total population of 12,390 in 2022.

History
Out of the 74 settlements he listed in the Ottoman nahiyah of Musabekli, 19th-century traveler Martin Hartmann noted 41 as Turkish (with a total of 554 households), 25 as Kurdish (247 households), 1 as Turkish and Abdal mixed (10 households), and 7 without any information on the population.

References

Districts of Kilis Province